"Rockstar" (stylized in all caps) is a song by American rapper DaBaby, featuring fellow American rapper Roddy Ricch. The song was released on April 17, 2020, as the second single from DaBaby's third studio album Blame It on Baby (2020). It was written by the two rappers. "Rockstar" spent seven non-consecutive weeks at the top of the Billboard Hot 100. Outside of the United States, "Rockstar" topped the charts in Australia, Canada, Denmark, Greece, New Zealand, Portugal, the Republic of Ireland, Switzerland, and the United Kingdom, and peaked within the top ten of the charts in Germany, the Netherlands, Norway, Sweden, and Finland. Its music video is set in a zombie apocalypse.

On June 12, 2020, DaBaby released a "BLM (Black Lives Matter) remix" of "Rockstar", which replaces the intro with an extra verse from him, before the rest of the song, regarding the George Floyd protests that started in May 2020, and his own experience with police abuse. The song received nominations for Record of the Year, Best Melodic Rap Performance, and Best Rap Song at the 63rd Annual Grammy Awards.

Critical reception
Reviewing the song's predecessor album for Entertainment Weekly, Sam Hockley-Smith found "Rockstar" and "Find My Way" "catchy and brooding", "allowing him [DaBaby] to rehash harrowing moments of violence, inner turmoil, and PTSD." In Pitchfork, Dani Blum noticed DaBaby "doesn't imitate Roddy Ricch as much as adjust his tone to complement the feature," thus, "his voice becomes softer, as close as DaBaby gets to tender, as he talks about the physical jolt of PTSD."

Commercial performance
"Rockstar" reached number one on the US Billboard Hot 100 in its seventh week, for the chart issue dated June 13, 2020. It became DaBaby's first chart-topper and Roddy Ricch's second. It also became DaBaby's first number one and Ricch's second on Hot R&B/Hip-Hop Songs and Hot Rap Songs charts. Along with "The Box", Ricch became the first artist to achieve his first two number one singles in the same year since Ed Sheeran did it in 2017. Topping the chart for a second week, it became the first single to spend multiple weeks on top after a run in which five songs each spent a first and only week at the summit. It spent seven non-consecutive weeks atop the chart. "Rockstar" has also spent six weeks at number one in both Australia and the UK, and eight weeks atop the Irish chart.

Music video
DaBaby teased a music video for "Rockstar" a week before its release, posting pictures on Instagram of the filming location. The Reel Goats-directed video was premiered on June 26, 2020, starring the two rappers hunting zombies in an open field. The seven-minute video also features a scene set to DaBaby's chorus and first verse to "Amazing Grace", which also is featured on Blame It On Baby following by the credits playing his verse from the Black Lives Matter remix.

In Rolling Stone, Jon Blistein noted the video "boasts a distinctly cinematic feel" as the two rappers are heavily armed shooting a horde of zombies with "plenty of over-the-top action," that is "balanced by a refreshingly self-aware sequence" in which the two perform the song backed by a group of zombies dancing and playing instruments.

Production
"Rockstar" was produced by North Carolina producer SethInTheKitchen who also co-wrote the song. The instrumental for "Rockstar" is a melodic trap beat featuring a guitar loop created from Spectrasonics' Omnisphere. The drums consist of a two-step hi-hat pattern with assorted hat rolls, sampled claps, snares, and kicks. It's bassline features an 808.

Awards and nominations

"Rockstar Black Lives Matter Remix"
On June 12, 2020, a remix of the song, titled "Rockstar Black Lives Matter Remix", was released. It joined many other protest songs that spoke out against police brutality in the wake of the deaths of Breonna Taylor and George Floyd. Jessica McKinney of Complex explained how on this version, DaBaby "discusses his multiple run-ins with the police, saying, 'Cops wanna pull me over, embarrass me/Abusin' power, you never knew me, thought I was arrogant/As a juvenile, police pulled their guns like they scared of me', while Roddy Ricch "shares a similar experience, recalling a time the police stopped him at a gas station". It later ended up on the deluxe version of Blame It On Baby, which was released on August 4, 2020.

Live performances
DaBaby and Ricch performed the song live at the 2020 BET Awards. The performance opened in a close-up shot of DaBaby on the ground with the knee of a police officer sitting on his neck — a recreation of George Floyd's murder. He then appeared surrounded by protesters — channeling the nationwide protests against police brutality — and performing in front of burning police cars. Ricch joined him for his verse, standing atop a cop car.

Cover versions
On July 18, 2020, rapper Mario Judah released his rendition of "Rockstar".

Charts

Weekly charts

Year-end charts

Certifications

Release history

See also
List of Billboard Hot 100 number ones of 2020

References

External links

2020 singles
2020 songs
Billboard Hot 100 number-one singles
Canadian Hot 100 number-one singles
DaBaby songs
Interscope Records singles
Irish Singles Chart number-one singles
Number-one singles in Australia
Number-one singles in Austria
Number-one singles in Denmark
Number-one singles in Greece
Number-one singles in New Zealand
Number-one singles in Portugal
Number-one singles in Switzerland
UK Singles Chart number-one singles
Roddy Ricch songs
Songs written by Roddy Ricch
Songs written by DaBaby
Songs about George Floyd
Songs about police brutality
Songs about police officers
Protest songs
Pop-rap songs